Venustatrochus secundus is a species of sea snail, a marine gastropod mollusk in the family Calliostomatidae, the top snails.

Description

Distribution

References

  Engl W. (2012) Shells of Antarctica. Hackenheim: Conchbooks. 402 pp.

secundus
Gastropods described in 1958